The Iraq women's national football team is the representative women's association football team of Iraq. Its governing body is the Iraq Football Association (IFA) and it competes as a member of the Asian Football Confederation (AFC).

The national team's first activity was in 2010, when they participated in 2010 Arabia Women's Cup. They made their first Asian cup qualifiers appearance in 2017 when they competed in Group A alongside Jordan, Philippines, Bahrain, UAE, and Tajikistan. As of July 2022 Iraq's Women Team is yet to win their first game, due to 5 years of inactivity Iraq is unranked in the FIFA Women's World Rankings.

Record per opponent
Key

The following table shows Seychelles' all-time official international record per opponent:

Results
Legend

2010

2011

2017

See also
 Iraq national football team results

References

External links
 Iraq results on The Roon Ba

Results
2010s in Iraq
Women's national association football team results